Notoproctus is a genus of marine polychaete worms in the family Maldanidae. It is the only member of the subfamily Notoproctinae.

Description
Notoproctus worms are characterized by the presence of cephalic and pygidial plates, a cephalic plate with a low rim, a wide prostomium that forms a low keel, strongly curved nuchal grooves, notochaetae with long and thick capillaries, neurochaetae shaped as acicular spines or reduced uncini in the first four chaetigers (i.e. segments with chaetae), subsequent chaetigers with a row of rostrate uncini, a pygidium with a flat pygidial plate with a low rim, and an anus dorsal to the plate. They have 10 to 17 chaetigers, and some achaetous (i.e. without chaetae) segments before the pygidium.

Classification
This genus contains 9 species:
Notoproctus abyssus 
Notoproctus godeffroyi 
Notoproctus laevis 
Notoproctus lineatus 
Notoproctus oculatus 
Notoproctus pacificus 
Notoproctus scutiferus 
Notoproctus sibogae

References

Polychaetes
Annelid genera